The 1919 college football season had no clear-cut champion, with the Official NCAA Division I Football Records Book listing Centre, Harvard, Illinois, Notre Dame, and Texas A&M as having been deemed national champions by major selectors Only Harvard, Illinois, and Texas A&M claim national championships for the 1919 season.  Texas A&M began claiming the 1919 national championship in 2012.

Conference and program changes

Conference memberships

Program changes
 University of Washington football officially adopted the Sun Dodgers nickname.
 State College of Washington (Washington State) football officially adopted the Cougars nickname.

Rose Bowl
Harvard defeated Oregon, 7–6, in the 1920 Rose Bowl.

Conference standings

Major conference standings

Independents

Minor conferences

Minor conference standings

Awards and honors

All-Americans

The consensus All-America team included:

Statistical leaders
 Team scoring most points: Centre, 485
 Player scoring most points: Ira Rodgers, West Virginia, 147
 Total offense leader: George Gipp, Notre Dame, 1456
 Passing yards leader: George Gipp, 727
 Passing touchdowns leader: Ira Rodgers, 11
 Receptions leader: Bernard Kirk, Notre Dame, 21
 Receiving yards leader: Bernard Kirk, 372

References